Saur Bazar is a block in Saharsa, Bihar, India. The average population of the block is approximately 214,166. the total number of villages is 55. the total number of Panchayats in Saur Bazar is 17.

Villages

References

Saharsa district
Blocks in Saharsa district